Nina R. Harper (born October 15, 1950) is an American politician who serves in the Maryland General Assembly representing Maryland's 45th legislative located in northeast Baltimore City.

Background

Harper was born on October 15, 1950, in Baltimore City to Geneva and Andres Himan. Her father was a merchant seaman from Colombia, South America. She attended Catholic schools in Baltimore and graduated from the St. Francis Academy Highschool there in 1968. After high school, Harper took a job with AT&T where she worked for 30 years.
Harper was a member of the Baltimore City Democratic Central Committee. She served as the executive director of the East Oliver Community Association from 2004 to 2015. Harper was also the co-chair, Baltimore Mayor Stephanie Rawlings-Blake Transition Team in 2010.

In the legislature
Harper was appointed by Governor O'Malley to fill the vacancy created after the death of Delegate Hattie N. Harrison. She was sworn in on February 27, 2013, and assigned to the House Ways and Means committee.

Death

Nina Harper passed away in December 29, 2018.

References

1950 births
Democratic Party members of the Maryland House of Delegates
Politicians from Baltimore
African-American state legislators in Maryland
African-American women in politics
Women state legislators in Maryland
AT&T people
American politicians of Colombian descent
Living people
21st-century American politicians
21st-century American women politicians
21st-century African-American women
21st-century African-American politicians
20th-century African-American people
20th-century African-American women